The United States Coast Guard's series of motor lifeboats included a class of 36 foot motor lifeboats.
The Coast Guard built the first of version these vessels in 1929 (Type "T"), and retired the last active version (Type "TRS" 1937–1956), in 1987 (CG-36535 Station Depoe Bay OR) as they were replaced by the 44 foot Steel Hull Motor Lifeboat.  CG 36500 was retired from active service in 1968, and has since been restored and preserved as a floating museum.
These vessels are remembered for the daring rescues Coast Guard seamen performed, using them.

Unlike the Coast Guard's more recent motor lifeboat, the 47 foot motor lifeboat, the 36 foot class was piloted entirely from an open cockpit, where crew-members were exposed to the elements. This was a hardship for the crew, as many rescues were of mariners at risk precisely because their vessels were at risk due to bad weather.

The most memorable rescue performed using a 36-foot lifeboat was that of crew members of the stricken SS Pendleton by CG 36500 under the command of Boatswain's Mate Bernard C. Webber.
The 2016 feature film The Finest Hours is based on the 1952 Pendleton rescue.

36 foot motor lifeboats on display

External links 
 Port Orford Life Boat Station Museum
 Coast Guard Motor Lifeboat 36500 Exhibit
 Michigan Maritime Museum
 Munising Coast Guard Station Museum
 Glen Haven Cannery Boathouse
 Umpqua River Lighthouse Museum

References

Motor Lifeboat
Motor lifeboats of the United States
History of the United States Coast Guard